Mohor Sheikh (born 21 March 1997) is a Bangladeshi cricketer. He made his first-class debut for Rajshahi Division in the 2018–19 National Cricket League on 8 October 2018. Later the same month, he was named in the Bangladesh Cricket Board XI's squad for a warm-up match with the visiting Zimbabwe team.

In October 2018, he was named in the squad for the Dhaka Dynamites team, following the draft for the 2018–19 Bangladesh Premier League. In December 2018, he was named in Bangladesh's team for the 2018 ACC Emerging Teams Asia Cup.

He made his Twenty20 debut for Dhaka Dynamites in the 2018–19 Bangladesh Premier League on 5 January 2019. He made his List A debut for Prime Bank Cricket Club in the 2018–19 Dhaka Premier Division Cricket League on 9 March 2019.

References

External links
 

1997 births
Living people
Bangladeshi cricketers
Dhaka Dominators cricketers
Prime Bank Cricket Club cricketers
Rajshahi Division cricketers
People from Rajshahi District